Klaus Kubitzki (born 1933) is a German botanist. He is an Emeritus professor in the University of Hamburg, at the Herbarium Hamburgense.   He is known for his work on the systematics and biogeography of the angiosperms, particularly those of the Neotropics, and also the floristic record of the Tertiary era. His plant systematic work is referred to as the Kubitzki system. He is a member of the American Society of Plant Taxonomists.

Career 
Born in Niesky, Oberlausitz, he undertook studies in biology and geology at the universities of Innsbruck, Goettingen and Kiel. His doctoral work at Kiel was in Quaternary studies (1960). He then became associate professor at the Universidad Austral de Chile in Valdivia, southern Chile (1961–1963). He pursued further studies at University of Münster (1968), from where he proceeded to a position as lecturer at the University of Munich till 1973, and then as professor of systematic botany at the University of Hamburg (1973 to 1998).

Work 
Kubitzky's contributions have included taxonomy, plant geography and geoecology. He made a special study of the Guayana Highland. His taxonomic work is contained in The Families and Genera of Vascular Plants (1990-).

Selected publications 

 . 1982a. Lorenthaceae. Volumes 2 & 4 of Flora de Venezuela.  Inst. Botanico
 . 1982b. Lauraceae I (Aniba & Aiouea). No. 31 of Flora neotropica monograph. Volume 1 de Lauraceae. New York Botanical Garden, 125 pp.

The Families and Genera of Vascular Plants (Springer-Verlag, Berlin) 

   1.
 2. 
   3. 
  4. 
  5. 
   6. 
   7. 
   8. 
   9. 
 10. 
 11. 
  12. 
  13. 
 14.

Eponyms 
Genus
 (Lauraceae) Kubitzkia van der Werff

Species
 (Asteraceae) Mikania kubitzkii R.M.King & H.Rob.
 (Dilleniaceae) Davilla kubitzkii

See also 
 Kubitzki system

References

Citations

Sources 

 Simpson, DP. 1979. Cassell's Latin Dictionary. 5, London: Cassell Ltd., 883. .

German taxonomists
1933 births
Living people
20th-century German botanists
21st-century German botanists
20th-century German scientists
21st-century German scientists